This is the first edition of the event. 2nd seed Jan Hájek defeated top seed Jesse Huta Galung in the final.

Seeds

Draw

Finals

Top half

Bottom half

References
 Main Draw
 Qualifying Draw

Maserati Challenger - Singles
2013 Singles